This is a list of tributaries of the Río de la Plata, or rivers of the La Plata Basin. Tributaries and sub-tributaries are hierarchically listed in order from the mouth of the Río de la Plata upriver. The terms "right" and "left" indicate on which side of the main stem river a tributary is located, from the perspective of looking downriver, following standard river bank terminology usage. Countries are identified in abbreviated form: AR for Argentina, UY for Uruguay, PY or PA for Paraguay, BR for Brazil, and BO for Bolivia. Major dams are also noted.

 Salado River: right; AR;  (Samborombón Bay); .
 Rio Vallimanca: right; AR.
 Samborombón River: right; AR;  (Samborombón Bay); GNS: .
 Santa Lucía River: left; UR.
 Matanza River (Riachuelo): right; AR; ; .
 Luján River: right; AR; ; .
 Reconquista River: right; AR
 San Juan River (Uruguay): left; UR; ; .

 San Salvador River (Uruguay): left; UY.
 Río Negro (Uruguay): left; UY; ; GNS: .
 Yí River: left; UY; ; .
 Porongos River: left; UY.
 Chamangá River: left; UY.
 Gualeguaychú River: right; AR; ; .
 Queguay Grande River: right; UY.
 Queguay Chico River: right; UY.
 Daymán River: right; UY; ; .
 Salto Grande Dam: AR, UY.
 Arapey Grande River: right; UY
 Arapey Chico River: right; UY.
 Mocoretá River: right; AR.
 Miriñay River: right; AR; ; .
 Quaraí River (Spanish Río Cuareim, Portuguese Rio Quaraí): left; UY, BR (border); ; .
 Ibicuí River: left; BR; ; .
 Itu River: right; BR; ; .
 Santa Maria River (Rio Grande do Sul): left Ibicuí source; BR; ; .
 Ibicuí-Mirim River: right Ibicuí source; BR; ; .
 Aguapey River: right; AR; ; .
 Icamaquã River: left; BR; ; .
 Ijuí River: left; BR; ; .
 Santa Rosa River (Rio Grande do Sul): left; BR; ; .
 Guarita River: left; BR.
 Das Antas River (Rio Grande do Sul): right; BR.
 Da Várzea River (Rio Grande do Sul): left; BR; ; .
 Chapecó River: right; BR; ; .
 Chapecozinho River: left; BR.
 Passo Fundo River: left; BR; ; .
 Irani River: right; BR; ; .
 Do Peixe River (Santa Catarina): right; BR.
 Forquetinha River: left; BR. 
 Canoas River (Santa Catarina): right Uruguay source; BR; ; .
 Campos Novos Dam: BR (Santa Catarina).
 Caveiras River: left; BR.
 Marombas River: right; BR (Santa Catarina); ; .
 Pelotas River: left Uruguay source; BR; ; .
 Vacas Gordas River: BR
 Pelotinhas River: BR
 Lava-Tudo River: BR
 São Mateus River (Santa Catarina): BR
 Antoninha River: BR
 Da Divisa River: BR
 Sumidouro River: BR
 Púlpito River: BR

 Paraná River: right; AR, PA, BR; ; GNS: ??.
 Arrecifes River: right; AR; ; .
 Gualeguay River: left; AR; ; .
 Arroyo del Medio; right; AR.
 Ludueña Stream: right; AR; ; .
 Carcarañá River: right; AR; ; .
 Tercero River (Calamuchita River): left Carcarañá source; AR; ; .
 Cuarto River (Saladillo River, Chocancharava River): right Carcarañá source; AR; ; .
 Urueña River: right; AR (Santiago Estero and Salta); ; .
 Arenales River
 Rosario River
 Guasamayo River
 Feliciano River: left; AR; ; .
 Guayquiraró River: left; AR; ; .
 Corrientes River: left, AR; ; .
 Paraná Miní River: right; AR; ; .
 Tapenagá River: right; AR; ; .
 Palometa River: right; AR; ; .
 Santa Lucía River: left; AR; ; .
 Negro River (Chaco): right; AR (Chaco); ; .
 Guaycurú River: right; AR (Chaco).

 Paraguay River: right; AR, PA, BR; ; GNS: .
 Río de Oro: right; AR; ; .
 Bermejo River (Teuco River): right; AR, BO; ; GNS: .
 Bermejito River: right (anabranch); AR; ; GNS: .
 Dorado River
 Teuquito River
 Seco River
 San Francisco River: right; AR (Salta, Jujuy); ; .
 Grande River
 Mojotoro River (Lavayén River)
 Pescado River: right; AR; ; .
 Iruya River: left; AR; ; .
 Río Grande de Tarija: left; AR; ; .
 Itaú River: left; AR and BO; ; .
 Lipeo River: right; AR; ; .
 Tebicuary River; left; PY; ; .
 Pilcomayo River: right; AR, BO: ; .
 Pilaya River (Bolivia)
 San Juan del Oro River (Bolivia)
 Río Grande de San Juan
 Confuso River: right, PA; ; .
 Salado River (Paraguay): left; PA; ; .
 Piribebuy River: left; PY.
 Manduvirá River: left; PY; ; .
 Aguaray-Guazú River (Paraguay River): right; PY
 Negro River (Paraguay): PY
 Jejuí Guazú River: left; PA.
 Monte Lindo River: PY
 Ypané River: left; PY; ; .
 Aquidabán River: left; PY
 Verde River (Paraguay): PY
 Apa River: left, PA, BR (border); ; .
 Perdido River (Mato Grosso do Sul): right; BR (Mato Grosso do Sul).
 Caracol River (Mato Grosso do Sul): right; BR (Mato Grosso do Sul).
 Amanguijá River: left; BR (Mato Grosso do Sul).
 Tarunã River: left; BR (Mato Grosso do Sul).
 Tererê River: left; BR (Mato Grosso do Sul).
 Branco River (Mato Grosso do Sul): left; BR (Mato Grosso do Sul).
 Aquidabã River (Mato Grosso do Sul): left; BR (Mato Grosso do Sul).
 Novo River (Paraguay River): right; BR (Mato Grosso do Sul).
 Miranda River (Brazil): left; BR (Mato Grosso do Sul); ; .
 Aquidauana River: right; BR (Mato Grosso do Sul).
 Salobra River: left; BR (Mato Grosso do Sul).
 Negro River (Mato Grosso do Sul): left; BR (Mato Grosso do Sul); ; .
 Taboco River: left; BR (Mato Grosso do Sul).
 Inhumas River (Mato Grosso do Sul): right; BR (Mato Grosso do Sul).
 Taquari-Mirim River (Mato Grosso do Sul): left; BR (Mato Grosso do Sul).
 Cuiabá River: BR; ; . 
 Paraguazinho River: left; BR (MG, Pantanal)
 Cassanje River: left; BR (Mato Grosso, Pantanal); 
 Jauru River (Mato Grosso): right; BR; ; .
 Aguapeí River: right; BR (Mato Grosso); ; .
 Cabaçal River: right; BR (Mato Grosso); ; .
 Vermelho River (Mato Grosso): right; BR (MG).
 Sepotuba River: left; BR (MG).

 (Paraná River above Paraguay confluence)
 Yacyretá Dam: AR, PY.
 San Antonio River: left; BR, AR (border).
 Chopim River: left; BR.
 Salt Santiago Dam
 Jordão River (Paraná): right; BR.
 Iratim River: left; BR.
 São Francisco River (Paraná): left; BR (Paraná).
 Piquiri River: left; BR (Paraná); ; .
 Goio-Erê River: right; BR.
 Cantú River: right; BR.
 Do Cobre River: left; BR.
 Ivaí River: left; BR (Paraná); ; .
 Ligeiro River: left; BR.
 Corumbataí River (Paraná): left; BR.
 Ivinhema River: right; BR (Mato Grosso do Sul).
 Paranapanema River: left; BR (Paraná and São Paulo border); ; .
 Rosana Dam
 Taquaruçu Dam
 Capivara Dam
 Tibagi River: left; BR (Paraná); ; .
 Iapó River: right; BR (Paraná).
 Das Cinzas River: left; BR (Paraná).
 Laranjinha River: left; BR (Paraná).
 Salto Grande Dam
 Pardo River (Paranapanema River): right; BR (São Paulo); ; .
 Xavantes Dam
 Itararé River: left: BR (Paraná and São Paulo border).
 Taquari-Guaçu River: left; BR (São Paulo).
 Apiai-Guaçu River: left; BR (São Paulo).
 Itapetininga River: right; BR (São Paulo); ; .
 Sérgio Motta Dam
 Pardo River (Mato Grosso do Sul): right; BR; ; .
 Anhanduí River: right; BR.
 Do Peixe River (Paraná River): left; BR (São Paulo).
 Verde River (Mato Grosso do Sul): right; BR.
 São Domingos River (Mato Grosso do Sul): left; BR.
 Aguapeí River (São Paulo): right; BR.
 Eng Souza Dias (Jupiá) Dam
 Sucuriú River: right; BR (Mato Grosse do Sul); ; .
 Tietê River: left; BR (São Paulo); ; .
 Três Irmãos Dam
 Nova Avanhandava Dam
 Promissão Dam
 Ibitinga Dam
 Bariri Dam
 Barra Bonita Dam
 Piracicaba River: right; BR (São Paulo); ; .
 Anhembi Dam
 Laras Dam
 Sorocaba River: left; BR; ; .
 Ituparanga Dam
 Sarapuí River (São Paulo): left; BR.
 Capivari River (Tietê River): right; BR; ; .
 Jundiaí River (upper Tietê River): right; BR; ; .
 Pinheiros River: left; BR (São Paulo state and São Paulo city); ; .
 Rio Grande (Pinheiros River): left; São Paulo City.
 Guarapiranga (reservoir): São Paulo City.
 Billings Reservoir: São Paulo City.
 Ilha Solteira Dam
 São José dos Dourados River: left; BR (São Paulo); ; .
 Grande River: left Paraná source; BR (São Paulo and Minas Gerais border); ; .
 Água Vermelha Dam
 Turvo River (Grande River): left; BR (São Paulo); ; .
 Marimbondo Dam
 Pardo River (São Paulo): left; BR; ; .
 Moji-Guaçu River: left; BR (São Paulo); ; .
 Moji-Mirim River: left?; BR.
 Porto Colõmbia Dam
 Volta Grande Dam
 Igarapava Dam
 Jaguará Dam
 Luiz Barreto (Estreito) Dam
 Furnas Dam
 Camargos Dam
 Aporé River: right; BR (Goiás and Mato Grosse  do Sul border); ; .
 Corrente River (Paranaíba River): right; BR (Goiás); ; .
 Claro River (Paranaíba River): right; BR (Goiás); ; .
 Doce River (Goiás): left; BR; ; .
 São Simão Dam
 Tijuco River: left; BR (Minas Gerais); ; .
 Da Prata River (Tijuco River): left; BR.
 Dos Bois River (Paranaíba River): right; BR (Goiás).
 Rio Verdão: right; BR.
 Meia Ponte River: right; BR (Goiás); ; .
 Cachoeira Dourada Dam
 Itumbiara Dam
 Araguari River (Minas Gerais) (also Das Velhas River): left; BR; ; 
 Uberabinha River: 
 Quebra-Anzol River:
 Emborcação Dam
 São Marcos River: right; BR; ; .
 Verde River (upper Paranaíba River): right; BR; ; .

References

Rio de la Plata
La Plata basin
International rivers of South America